Holy Week is commemorated each year in Santa Cruz de La Palma, Canary Islands, by processions marking the Passion, Death and Resurrection of Jesus Christ. It is one of the oldest festivities in the island of La Palma, and is the most significant public religious event that takes place in the city, except for the Lustral Festivity of the Bajada de la Virgen. In 2014 it was declared a Fiesta of Tourist Interest in the Canary Islands.

Features
In addition to preserving some traditional rites, the event incorporates others of recent creation. It is noted for the rigorous chronology observed in all processions, in which the order narrated in the Bible is followed, and for the antiquity and variety of the musical genres that are performed during the processions. Another feature of interest is the quality of its sculpted imagery, with carvings from the ancient Spanish provinces of the Netherlands, colonial America, the eighteenth-century Sevillian school, nineteenth-century neoclassicism – with the presence of some of the best works by Canary Islands sculptor Fernando Estévez – and the most brilliant periods of local sculpture.

The urban setting of Santa Cruz de La Palma, through which most of the processions take place, was declared Conjunto histórico (Historic-Artistic Grouping) in 1975.

See also
Holy Week in San Cristóbal de La Laguna
Holy Week in Spain
Capirote

Notes

Bibliography
 
 
 
 

Holy Week in Spain
La Palma
Canarian culture